Catocala jonasii is a moth in the family Erebidae first described by Arthur Gardiner Butler in 1877. It is found in Japan.

References

jonasii
Moths described in 1877
Moths of Japan